Jhansi is an Indian television presenter and film actress. She has also appeared in several Tollywood films and a few TV shows. She made her debut in Tollywood in the year 1994.
 She won five Nandi Awards.

Filmography

As an actress

As a dubbing artist 
 Alludugaaru Vachcharu (1999) for Kausalya
 Priyaralu Pilichindi (2000), Idi Sangathi (2008) for Tabu
 Thenali (2000) for Jyothika
 Kanchana (2011) for Devadarshini
 jai bolo Telangana(2011) for Smriti Irani

Television career
As host
Talk of the Town for Gemini TV
Sunday Sandadi for ETV Telugu
Manoyagnam serial for ETV Telugu
Sarada serial for Gemini TV
Brain of Andhra for MAA TV
Pelli Pustakam for MAA TV
Black (season 1,2&3) for  ETV Telugu
Ko Ante Koti for Gemini TV
Lakku Kikku for Zee Telugu
Bangaru kutumbam for Zee Telugu
Box lo Bangaram for Gemini TV
Naveena for TV9
Chetana for TV9
Starmaa Parivar League for Star Maa
Start Music for Star Maa
Starmaa Parivar League (season 2) for Star Maa
Starmaa Parivar League (Season 3) for Star Maa
As actress
Amrutham for Gemini TV (as Sanjeevini)
The Baker and The Beauty for Aha (as Padma Dasaripalle)

Awards
Nandi Awards
Best Supporting Actress - Thodu (1997)
Best Supporting Actress - Jayam Manadera (2000)
Best Female Comedian - Tulasi (2007)
Best Female Comedian - Simha (2010)

References

External links
 

Indian television news anchors
Telugu television anchors
Actresses in Telugu cinema
Living people
Women television journalists
Actresses from Vijayawada
Telugu actresses
Actresses in Telugu television
1971 births